Sclerophantis is a genus of moth in the family Gelechiidae. It contains the species Sclerophantis cyanocorys, which is found in Indonesia (Java).

References

Gelechiinae